Episcomitra zonata, common name zoned mitre, is a species of sea snail, a marine gastropod mollusk in the family Mitridae, the miters or miter snails.

Description
Episcomitra zonata has a shell reaching a length of 60–100 mm. The shape of the shell is elongated and slender. The surface is reddish brown with a dark brown spiral band. The interior is always white, with a long and narrow mouth.

Distribution
This quite rare and endangered marine species is endemic to the Mediterranean Sea and to the Adriatic Sea; it has also been found off the Azores.

Habitat
Episcomitra zonata can be found at depths of 20– 80 m.

References

 Marryat, F. (1819). Descriptions of two new shells. Transactions of the Linnean Society of London. 12 (2): 336-339, pl. 10

External links
 Encyclopedia of life
 Najada.com

zonata
Gastropods described in 1818